Deer are ruminant mammals forming the family Cervidae.

Deer may also refer to:

Animals
 Mouse-deer
 Musk deer, several species that make up Moschus

People
 Deer (given name), a Native American given name
 Deer (surname), a surname

Places
 Deer Abbey, Buchan, Scotland
 Deer Creek (disambiguation)
 Deer Hill (disambiguation)
 Deer Island (disambiguation)
 Deer Lake (disambiguation)
 Deer Mountain (disambiguation)
 Deer Pond (disambiguation)
 Deer River (disambiguation)

United States
 Deer, Missouri, a community
 Deer Falls, Washington
 Deer Township, Roseau County, Minnesota

Other uses
 Deer Jet, one of the subsidiaries of Hainan Airlines group
 The Deer (film), an Iranian film
 Great Wall Deer, a Chinese pick-up

See also
Deers (disambiguation)
Deere, as in John Deere